Mania (stylized as M A  N   I    A) is the seventh studio album by American rock band Fall Out Boy, released on January 19, 2018, on Island Records and DCD2 as the follow-up to their sixth studio album, American Beauty/American Psycho (2015). The album was produced by Jonny Coffer, Illangelo, Dave Sardy, Jesse Shatkin, and longtime collaborator Butch Walker, as well as self-production from the band. The album was preceded by five singles; "Young and Menace", "Champion", "The Last of the Real Ones", "Hold Me Tight or Don't", and "Wilson (Expensive Mistakes)".

Upon the album release, Mania received largely mixed reviews from music critics, but fared well commercially, debuting at number-one on the US Billboard 200. However, it is the band's first album since their debut studio album, Take This to Your Grave (2003), to not produce a Billboard Hot 100 single on the chart. The album was nominated for the category of Best Rock Album at the 61st Annual Grammy Awards.

Background
Fall Out Boy enjoyed commercial success and worldwide acclaim after releasing their sixth studio album, American Beauty/American Psycho (2015). During the extensive touring in support of the album, the group began writing and recording material for a seventh album. The beginning of the production process for Mania began after the band's frontman Patrick Stump introduced the song "Young and Menace" to bass guitarist Pete Wentz at Reading and Leeds Festival in 2016, which inspired the musicians to record a full-length. In an interview with Rolling Stone, Wentz described the vision behind Mania. "It feels like every once in awhile, you've gotta do a hard restart that clears the cache and erases the hard drive. I think that's what [Mania] was – a big palette cleanse," said Wentz.

After the release of the album's first two singles, "Young and Menace" and "Champion", Patrick Stump issued a statement on Twitter confirming that the band was postponing the release date for Mania until January 19, 2018 due to the album "feeling rushed."

Album delay
Mania was originally scheduled for a release on September 15, 2017, worldwide. However, on August 3, 2017, Patrick Stump announced that the record would be pushed back until January 19, 2018. "The album just really isn't ready, and it felt very rushed," Stump said on Twitter. "I'm never going to put a record out I genuinely don't believe is at least as strong or valid as the one that came before it and in order to do that we need a little bit more time to properly and carefully record solid performances."

On November 6, 2017, the band announced on social media that the album had been completed and revealed the tracklist. In the lead up to the album's release, it became evident that several streaming platforms had published the tracks of the album out of order. The physical copies retain the order originally released by the band.

Composition

Music
The album sees the group further departing from a pop-punk and alternative rock sound and having a more "experimental" approach to their newfound sound, incorporating pop rock, electropop, and synth-pop.

Promotion & The M A  N   I   A Experience
In support of the album, the band performed the singles on television and embarked on the Mania Tour in October 2017. The tour, which took place in both North America, Australia and New Zealand, featured support from blackbear, Jaden Smith, and Waax. The song "Wilson (Expensive Mistakes)", was debuted live on October 20, 2017, as part of the Mania Tour's setlist.

To promote their headlining gig at Wrigley Field, M A  N   I   A, as well as their then-just-release EP, "Lake Effect Kid", the band held a pop-up event in Chicago, IL titled "The M A  N   I   A Experience." The M A  N   I   A Experience, according to the band, was the analog to the album. It featured many rooms named after songs from the record, including "Wilson," a dimly-lit jungle with the lyrics "I'll stop wearing black when they make a darker color" on the wall; "Sunshine Riptide," which featured a ball pit with pills and pill bottles with the FOB logo on them, and had "The pills are kicking in" on the wall; Room three was titled "Give Me a Boost", taken from their song "Heaven's Gate." This room was unique as it had headphones for fans to listen to unreleased tracks and remixes, including one version of a song sang by Rivers Cuomo of Weezer. Each set of headphones had a different song that fans could listen to. The room also featured warped mirrors on the wall, as well as spinning faceless ballerinas and a broken music box with the lyrics "One look from you and I'm on that faded love out of my body, and I'm flying up above." The washroom in the facility was also FOB-themed and had posters for their album as well as strands of yarn on the mirrors for fans to take a picture with, a homage to the artwork for their EP "Lake Effect Kid." Room four was "Young and Menace"-themed, and was upside-down. Fans also had the opportunity to listen to music with headphones while feeling upside down. Room five was "Church"-themed, and had gothic themed curtains surrounding a coffin. The coffin was a mirror that had the effect of making it look endless. Room six was in the theme of "HOLD ME TIGHT OR DON'T," with loads of teddybears of various sizes. There was also a room in which Pete Wentz, as well as Andy Hurley, would be in a box writing with headphones on with a sign that read: "Don't Tap on The Glass," which is a reference to their song "Sunshine Riptide." This room also referenced "Church" where fans could write on the wall "confessing their sins."

Llamania

During recording sessions for Mania, the band scrapped three unfinished tracks; "Past Life", "Wrong Side of Paradise", and "Footprints in the Snow". The tracks were released by Fall Out Boy, under the alias Frosty & The Nightmare Making Machines, in the form of an extended play (EP), entitled Llamania, on February 23, 2018, through physical CD.

Singles
The lead single, "Young and Menace", was released on April 27, 2017 alongside its music video. The song has a notable influence from the EDM genre, hinting at another progression of the band's sound with the album. The second single, "Champion", was released on June 22 in the U.S. and on June 23 worldwide with the “visualizer” music video. On July 27, the official music video was released for the song. The third single, "The Last of the Real Ones", was released on September 14, 2017. The fourth single, "Hold Me Tight or Don't", was released on November 15 with its music video, which takes a notable influence from the Mexican holiday Day Of The Dead. "Wilson (Expensive Mistakes)" was released as the fifth single, accompanied with its music video premiere on January 11, 2018. A music video for "Church" was released along with the album on January 19, 2018. On July 23, 2018, a music video for "Bishops Knife Trick" was released.

Critical reception

Mania received mixed reviews from music critics. At Metacritic, which assigns a normalised rating out of 100 to reviews from mainstream critics, the album has an average score of 59 based on 12 reviews, indicating "mixed or average reviews".

Commercial performance
Mania debuted at number one on the US Billboard 200 on February 3, 2018 with 130,000 album-equivalent units, of which 117,000 were pure album sales. It is Fall Out Boy's fourth US number-one album. In Nielsen's mid-year music chart for 2018, Mania was the number three rock album in both equivalent units and sales, with 233,000 equivalent units including 162,000 pure sales.

Track listing
Upon its initial release to several digital music retailers, the order of the track listing was incorrect. The band later confirmed that the track listing on the physical releases was correct across all versions of the release and that these would soon be corrected.

Notes
  – additional production
 Additional production and engineering on all songs by Fall Out Boy
 "Hold Me Tight or Don't" is stylised in all caps.

Personnel
Personnel adapted from Tidal and the CD back cover.

Fall Out Boy
 Patrick Stump – lead vocals, rhythm guitar, keyboards, additional programming, percussion
 Joe Trohman – lead guitar, backing vocals, lap steel, additional programming, keyboards
 Pete Wentz – bass guitar, backing vocals
 Andy Hurley – drums, percussion

Production
 Jesse Shatkin – production, mixing
 Butch Walker – production
 Andrew Wells – production
 Fall Out Boy – primary production
 Suzy Shinn – engineering
 Rouble Kapoor – assistant engineering
 Dave Sardy – 	mixing, producer 
 David Andersen – assistant engineer 

Management
 Dustin Addis – management
 Jonathan Daniel – management
 Bob McLynn – management
 Evan Taubenfeld – A&R
 Elizabeth Vago – A&R administration
 Marlene Tsuchii – booking
 Mark Ngui – booking
 Andrew Simon – booking
 Marcia Hyman – business management
 Michael L. Mckoy – legal
 Sharon Timure – marketing
 Vol. S. Davis III – business affairs
 Ian Allen – business affairs
 Antoinette Trotman – business affairs
 Cindy Zaplachinski – business affairs

Artwork
 Pete Wentz – art direction
 Pamela Littky – photography
 Brendan Walter – layout designer
 Jade Ehlers – layout designer
 Kaitlin Sweet – illustrations
 Matt Burnette-Lemon – package production

Charts

Weekly charts

Year-end charts

Certifications

References

2018 albums
Fall Out Boy albums
Island Records albums
Albums produced by Illangelo
Albums produced by Dave Sardy
Albums produced by Butch Walker
Electropop albums
DCD2 Records albums